Yeşilören can refer to:

 Yeşilören, Kurşunlu
 Yeşilören, Merzifon